The 1947 VFL season was the 51st season of the Victorian Football League (VFL), the highest level senior Australian rules football competition in Victoria. The season featured twelve clubs, ran from 19 April until 27 September, and comprised a 19-game home-and-away season followed by a finals series featuring the top four clubs.

The premiership was won by the Carlton Football Club for the eighth time, after it defeated  by one point in the 1947 VFL Grand Final.

Premiership season
In 1947, the VFL competition consisted of twelve teams of 18 on-the-field players each, plus two substitute players, known as the 19th man and the 20th man. A player could be substituted for any reason; however, once substituted, a player could not return to the field of play under any circumstances.

Teams played each other in a home-and-away season of 19 rounds; matches 12 to 19 were the "home-and-way reverse" of matches 1 to 8.

Once the 19 round home-and-away season had finished, the 1947 VFL Premiers were determined by the specific format and conventions of the Page–McIntyre system.

Round 1

|- bgcolor="#CCCCFF"
| Home team
| Home team score
| Away team
| Away team score
| Venue
| Crowd
| Date
|- bgcolor="#FFFFFF"
| 
| 19.15 (129)
| 
| 12.12 (84)
| Kardinia Park
| 13,000
| 19 April 1947
|- bgcolor="#FFFFFF"
| 
| 16.23 (119)
| 
| 10.8 (68)
| Windy Hill
| 19,000
| 19 April 1947
|- bgcolor="#FFFFFF"
| 
| 20.18 (138)
| 
| 14.8 (92)
| Victoria Park
| 24,000
| 19 April 1947
|- bgcolor="#FFFFFF"
| 
| 17.20 (122)
| 
| 16.13 (109)
| Princes Park
| 24,000
| 19 April 1947
|- bgcolor="#FFFFFF"
| 
| 18.27 (135)
| 
| 15.14 (104)
| Punt Road Oval
| 20,000
| 19 April 1947
|- bgcolor="#FFFFFF"
| 
| 12.16 (88)
| 
| 22.17 (149)
| Junction Oval
| 14,000
| 19 April 1947

Round 2

|- bgcolor="#CCCCFF"
| Home team
| Home team score
| Away team
| Away team score
| Venue
| Crowd
| Date
|- bgcolor="#FFFFFF"
| 
| 8.11 (59)
| 
| 8.13 (61)
| Arden Street Oval
| 8,000
| 26 April 1947
|- bgcolor="#FFFFFF"
| 
| 13.22 (100)
| 
| 11.11 (77)
| Brunswick Street Oval
| 22,000
| 26 April 1947
|- bgcolor="#FFFFFF"
| 
| 14.25 (109)
| 
| 11.7 (73)
| MCG
| 12,000
| 26 April 1947
|- bgcolor="#FFFFFF"
| 
| 15.13 (103)
| 
| 13.11 (89)
| Western Oval
| 22,000
| 26 April 1947
|- bgcolor="#FFFFFF"
| 
| 13.9 (87)
| 
| 19.20 (134)
| Glenferrie Oval
| 15,000
| 26 April 1947
|- bgcolor="#FFFFFF"
| 
| 12.12 (84)
| 
| 9.16 (70)
| Lake Oval
| 30,000
| 26 April 1947

Round 3

|- bgcolor="#CCCCFF"
| Home team
| Home team score
| Away team
| Away team score
| Venue
| Crowd
| Date
|- bgcolor="#FFFFFF"
| 
| 12.20 (92)
| 
| 12.11 (83)
| Brunswick Street Oval
| 18,000
| 3 May 1947
|- bgcolor="#FFFFFF"
| 
| 21.10 (136)
| 
| 19.11 (125)
| Windy Hill
| 13,000
| 3 May 1947
|- bgcolor="#FFFFFF"
| 
| 10.18 (78)
| 
| 12.10 (82)
| Lake Oval
| 18,000
| 3 May 1947
|- bgcolor="#FFFFFF"
| 
| 12.10 (82)
| 
| 20.14 (134)
| Glenferrie Oval
| 11,000
| 3 May 1947
|- bgcolor="#FFFFFF"
| 
| 12.17 (89)
| 
| 14.24 (108)
| Kardinia Park
| 14,600
| 3 May 1947
|- bgcolor="#FFFFFF"
| 
| 5.18 (48)
| 
| 17.19 (121)
| Punt Road Oval
| 32,000
| 3 May 1947

Round 4

|- bgcolor="#CCCCFF"
| Home team
| Home team score
| Away team
| Away team score
| Venue
| Crowd
| Date
|- bgcolor="#FFFFFF"
| 
| 19.24 (138)
| 
| 12.14 (86)
| Victoria Park
| 25,000
| 10 May 1947
|- bgcolor="#FFFFFF"
| 
| 16.16 (112)
| 
| 7.16 (58)
| Princes Park
| 37,000
| 10 May 1947
|- bgcolor="#FFFFFF"
| 
| 10.12 (72)
| 
| 18.12 (120)
| Punt Road Oval
| 16,000
| 10 May 1947
|- bgcolor="#FFFFFF"
| 
| 10.17 (77)
| 
| 12.12 (84)
| Junction Oval
| 10,500
| 10 May 1947
|- bgcolor="#FFFFFF"
| 
| 4.15 (39)
| 
| 19.26 (140)
| Arden Street Oval
| 12,000
| 10 May 1947
|- bgcolor="#FFFFFF"
| 
| 11.17 (83)
| 
| 16.19 (115)
| Kardinia Park
| 14,500
| 10 May 1947

Round 5

|- bgcolor="#CCCCFF"
| Home team
| Home team score
| Away team
| Away team score
| Venue
| Crowd
| Date
|- bgcolor="#FFFFFF"
| 
| 16.11 (107)
| 
| 10.9 (69)
| Glenferrie Oval
| 13,000
| 17 May 1947
|- bgcolor="#FFFFFF"
| 
| 17.18 (120)
| 
| 11.13 (79)
| Western Oval
| 13,000
| 17 May 1947
|- bgcolor="#FFFFFF"
| 
| 19.18 (132)
| 
| 7.14 (56)
| Brunswick Street Oval
| 10,000
| 17 May 1947
|- bgcolor="#FFFFFF"
| 
| 13.9 (87)
| 
| 15.16 (106)
| Lake Oval
| 12,000
| 17 May 1947
|- bgcolor="#FFFFFF"
| 
| 15.5 (95)
| 
| 9.16 (70)
| MCG
| 33,500
| 17 May 1947
|- bgcolor="#FFFFFF"
| 
| 8.16 (64)
| 
| 14.7 (91)
| Windy Hill
| 32,000
| 17 May 1947

Round 6

|- bgcolor="#CCCCFF"
| Home team
| Home team score
| Away team
| Away team score
| Venue
| Crowd
| Date
|- bgcolor="#FFFFFF"
| 
| 9.12 (66)
| 
| 12.9 (81)
| Glenferrie Oval
| 16,000
| 24 May 1947
|- bgcolor="#FFFFFF"
| 
| 8.15 (63)
| 
| 15.11 (101)
| Brunswick Street Oval
| 16,000
| 24 May 1947
|- bgcolor="#FFFFFF"
| 
| 18.18 (126)
| 
| 11.11 (77)
| Punt Road Oval
| 14,500
| 24 May 1947
|- bgcolor="#FFFFFF"
| 
| 15.12 (102)
| 
| 14.10 (94)
| Arden Street Oval
| 12,000
| 24 May 1947
|- bgcolor="#FFFFFF"
| 
| 13.12 (90)
| 
| 10.16 (76)
| Western Oval
| 26,000
| 24 May 1947
|- bgcolor="#FFFFFF"
| 
| 7.11 (53)
| 
| 23.17 (155)
| Junction Oval
| 18,000
| 24 May 1947

Round 7

|- bgcolor="#CCCCFF"
| Home team
| Home team score
| Away team
| Away team score
| Venue
| Crowd
| Date
|- bgcolor="#FFFFFF"
| 
| 7.12 (54)
| 
| 6.13 (49)
| Kardinia Park
| 13,500
| 31 May 1947
|- bgcolor="#FFFFFF"
| 
| 11.17 (83)
| 
| 10.14 (74)
| Windy Hill
| 17,500
| 31 May 1947
|- bgcolor="#FFFFFF"
| 
| 10.13 (73)
| 
| 10.14 (74)
| Victoria Park
| 27,500
| 31 May 1947
|- bgcolor="#FFFFFF"
| 
| 13.21 (99)
| 
| 11.14 (80)
| Princes Park
| 25,000
| 31 May 1947
|- bgcolor="#FFFFFF"
| 
| 15.14 (104)
| 
| 12.20 (92)
| Lake Oval
| 15,000
| 31 May 1947
|- bgcolor="#FFFFFF"
| 
| 17.3 (105)
| 
| 15.8 (98)
| MCG
| 34,500
| 31 May 1947

Round 8

|- bgcolor="#CCCCFF"
| Home team
| Home team score
| Away team
| Away team score
| Venue
| Crowd
| Date
|- bgcolor="#FFFFFF"
| 
| 15.15 (105)
| 
| 5.13 (43)
| MCG
| 11,000
| 7 June 1947
|- bgcolor="#FFFFFF"
| 
| 10.15 (75)
| 
| 10.11 (71)
| Glenferrie Oval
| 12,000
| 7 June 1947
|- bgcolor="#FFFFFF"
| 
| 16.21 (117)
| 
| 7.10 (52)
| Princes Park
| 16,000
| 7 June 1947
|- bgcolor="#FFFFFF"
| 
| 15.9 (99)
| 
| 15.13 (103)
| Lake Oval
| 24,000
| 7 June 1947
|- bgcolor="#FFFFFF"
| 
| 12.11 (83)
| 
| 7.7 (49)
| Western Oval
| 20,000
| 7 June 1947
|- bgcolor="#FFFFFF"
| 
| 9.14 (68)
| 
| 11.16 (82)
| Windy Hill
| 22,000
| 7 June 1947

Round 9

|- bgcolor="#CCCCFF"
| Home team
| Home team score
| Away team
| Away team score
| Venue
| Crowd
| Date
|- bgcolor="#FFFFFF"
| 
| 16.15 (111)
| 
| 8.14 (62)
| Brunswick Street Oval
| 13,000
| 14 June 1947
|- bgcolor="#FFFFFF"
| 
| 9.6 (60)
| 
| 11.15 (81)
| Arden Street Oval
| 14,000
| 14 June 1947
|- bgcolor="#FFFFFF"
| 
| 16.7 (103)
| 
| 11.20 (86)
| Kardinia Park
| 14,500
| 14 June 1947
|- bgcolor="#FFFFFF"
| 
| 7.14 (56)
| 
| 18.17 (125)
| Punt Road Oval
| 34,000
| 14 June 1947
|- bgcolor="#FFFFFF"
| 
| 11.9 (75)
| 
| 18.13 (121)
| Junction Oval
| 12,000
| 16 June 1947
|- bgcolor="#FFFFFF"
| 
| 16.16 (112)
| 
| 13.8 (86)
| Victoria Park
| 43,500
| 16 June 1947

Round 10

|- bgcolor="#CCCCFF"
| Home team
| Home team score
| Away team
| Away team score
| Venue
| Crowd
| Date
|- bgcolor="#FFFFFF"
| 
| 8.11 (59)
| 
| 9.15 (69)
| MCG
| 28,000
| 21 June 1947
|- bgcolor="#FFFFFF"
| 
| 4.17 (41)
| 
| 10.12 (72)
| Western Oval
| 20,000
| 21 June 1947
|- bgcolor="#FFFFFF"
| 
| 13.8 (86)
| 
| 18.11 (119)
| Arden Street Oval
| 8,000
| 21 June 1947
|- bgcolor="#FFFFFF"
| 
| 6.9 (45)
| 
| 18.20 (128)
| Glenferrie Oval
| 14,000
| 21 June 1947
|- bgcolor="#FFFFFF"
| 
| 9.13 (67)
| 
| 15.20 (110)
| Junction Oval
| 11,000
| 21 June 1947
|- bgcolor="#FFFFFF"
| 
| 8.7 (55)
| 
| 10.8 (68)
| Brunswick Street Oval
| 29,000
| 21 June 1947

Round 11

|- bgcolor="#CCCCFF"
| Home team
| Home team score
| Away team
| Away team score
| Venue
| Crowd
| Date
|- bgcolor="#FFFFFF"
| 
| 23.15 (153)
| 
| 7.10 (52)
| Punt Road Oval
| 13,000
| 28 June 1947
|- bgcolor="#FFFFFF"
| 
| 12.13 (85)
| 
| 10.15 (75)
| Windy Hill
| 21,000
| 28 June 1947
|- bgcolor="#FFFFFF"
| 
| 14.19 (103)
| 
| 9.15 (69)
| Victoria Park
| 15,000
| 28 June 1947
|- bgcolor="#FFFFFF"
| 
| 18.17 (125)
| 
| 8.14 (62)
| Princes Park
| 14,000
| 28 June 1947
|- bgcolor="#FFFFFF"
| 
| 15.9 (99)
| 
| 12.10 (82)
| Lake Oval
| 25,000
| 28 June 1947
|- bgcolor="#FFFFFF"
| 
| 10.10 (70)
| 
| 11.15 (81)
| Kardinia Park
| 16,000
| 28 June 1947

Round 12

|- bgcolor="#CCCCFF"
| Home team
| Home team score
| Away team
| Away team score
| Venue
| Crowd
| Date
|- bgcolor="#FFFFFF"
| 
| 4.10 (34)
| 
| 12.11 (83)
| Arden Street Oval
| 7,500
| 5 July 1947
|- bgcolor="#FFFFFF"
| 
| 5.14 (44)
| 
| 6.8 (44)
| Western Oval
| 10,000
| 5 July 1947
|- bgcolor="#FFFFFF"
| 
| 12.11 (83)
| 
| 16.21 (117)
| Glenferrie Oval
| 5,500
| 5 July 1947
|- bgcolor="#FFFFFF"
| 
| 8.14 (62)
| 
| 11.17 (83)
| Lake Oval
| 18,000
| 5 July 1947
|- bgcolor="#FFFFFF"
| 
| 9.11 (65)
| 
| 7.6 (48)
| Brunswick Street Oval
| 18,000
| 5 July 1947
|- bgcolor="#FFFFFF"
| 
| 9.10 (64)
| 
| 10.9 (69)
| MCG
| 38,000
| 5 July 1947

Round 13

|- bgcolor="#CCCCFF"
| Home team
| Home team score
| Away team
| Away team score
| Venue
| Crowd
| Date
|- bgcolor="#FFFFFF"
| 
| 16.11 (107)
| 
| 5.16 (46)
| Kardinia Park
| 15,000
| 12 July 1947
|- bgcolor="#FFFFFF"
| 
| 10.18 (78)
| 
| 8.11 (59)
| Windy Hill
| 20,000
| 12 July 1947
|- bgcolor="#FFFFFF"
| 
| 8.17 (65)
| 
| 6.9 (45)
| Victoria Park
| 12,000
| 12 July 1947
|- bgcolor="#FFFFFF"
| 
| 10.14 (74)
| 
| 9.16 (70)
| Princes Park
| 28,000
| 12 July 1947
|- bgcolor="#FFFFFF"
| 
| 8.15 (63)
| 
| 13.25 (103)
| Junction Oval
| 6,000
| 12 July 1947
|- bgcolor="#FFFFFF"
| 
| 12.12 (84)
| 
| 11.12 (78)
| Punt Road Oval
| 28,000
| 12 July 1947

Round 14

|- bgcolor="#CCCCFF"
| Home team
| Home team score
| Away team
| Away team score
| Venue
| Crowd
| Date
|- bgcolor="#FFFFFF"
| 
| 8.14 (62)
| 
| 8.18 (66)
| Arden Street Oval
| 8,000
| 19 July 1947
|- bgcolor="#FFFFFF"
| 
| 13.18 (96)
| 
| 10.7 (67)
| Western Oval
| 10,000
| 19 July 1947
|- bgcolor="#FFFFFF"
| 
| 12.11 (83)
| 
| 11.11 (77)
| Victoria Park
| 15,000
| 19 July 1947
|- bgcolor="#FFFFFF"
| 
| 10.10 (70)
| 
| 9.9 (63)
| Princes Park
| 26,000
| 19 July 1947
|- bgcolor="#FFFFFF"
| 
| 7.10 (52)
| 
| 11.8 (74)
| MCG
| 23,000
| 19 July 1947
|- bgcolor="#FFFFFF"
| 
| 7.13 (55)
| 
| 14.18 (102)
| Junction Oval
| 7,000
| 19 July 1947

Round 15

|- bgcolor="#CCCCFF"
| Home team
| Home team score
| Away team
| Away team score
| Venue
| Crowd
| Date
|- bgcolor="#FFFFFF"
| 
| 10.12 (72)
| 
| 11.15 (81)
| MCG
| 32,000
| 26 July 1947
|- bgcolor="#FFFFFF"
| 
| 16.18 (114)
| 
| 10.9 (69)
| Glenferrie Oval
| 5,000
| 26 July 1947
|- bgcolor="#FFFFFF"
| 
| 16.7 (103)
| 
| 7.14 (56)
| Brunswick Street Oval
| 11,000
| 26 July 1947
|- bgcolor="#FFFFFF"
| 
| 16.21 (117)
| 
| 12.5 (77)
| Windy Hill
| 16,000
| 26 July 1947
|- bgcolor="#FFFFFF"
| 
| 9.15 (69)
| 
| 9.15 (69)
| Lake Oval
| 25,000
| 26 July 1947
|- bgcolor="#FFFFFF"
| 
| 13.11 (89)
| 
| 14.9 (93)
| Western Oval
| 25,000
| 26 July 1947

Round 16

|- bgcolor="#CCCCFF"
| Home team
| Home team score
| Away team
| Away team score
| Venue
| Crowd
| Date
|- bgcolor="#FFFFFF"
| 
| 7.12 (54)
| 
| 13.16 (94)
| Princes Park
| 38,000
| 2 August 1947
|- bgcolor="#FFFFFF"
| 
| 13.18 (96)
| 
| 8.7 (55)
| Punt Road Oval
| 12,000
| 2 August 1947
|- bgcolor="#FFFFFF"
| 
| 9.9 (63)
| 
| 10.17 (77)
| Junction Oval
| 8,000
| 2 August 1947
|- bgcolor="#FFFFFF"
| 
| 13.19 (97)
| 
| 7.19 (61)
| Kardinia Park
| 15,500
| 9 August 1947
|- bgcolor="#FFFFFF"
| 
| 7.14 (56)
| 
| 7.19 (61)
| Victoria Park
| 25,000
| 9 August 1947
|- bgcolor="#FFFFFF"
| 
| 10.12 (72)
| 
| 11.10 (76)
| Arden Street Oval
| 12,000
| 9 August 1947

Round 17

|- bgcolor="#CCCCFF"
| Home team
| Home team score
| Away team
| Away team score
| Venue
| Crowd
| Date
|- bgcolor="#FFFFFF"
| 
| 16.19 (115)
| 
| 13.9 (87)
| Kardinia Park
| 18,500
| 16 August 1947
|- bgcolor="#FFFFFF"
| 
| 19.12 (126)
| 
| 12.14 (86)
| Windy Hill
| 13,000
| 16 August 1947
|- bgcolor="#FFFFFF"
| 
| 17.10 (112)
| 
| 12.12 (84)
| Victoria Park
| 25,000
| 16 August 1947
|- bgcolor="#FFFFFF"
| 
| 14.19 (103)
| 
| 3.12 (30)
| Princes Park
| 11,000
| 16 August 1947
|- bgcolor="#FFFFFF"
| 
| 13.21 (99)
| 
| 14.9 (93)
| MCG
| 11,500
| 16 August 1947
|- bgcolor="#FFFFFF"
| 
| 10.11 (71)
| 
| 12.10 (82)
| Lake Oval
| 20,000
| 16 August 1947

Round 18

|- bgcolor="#CCCCFF"
| Home team
| Home team score
| Away team
| Away team score
| Venue
| Crowd
| Date
|- bgcolor="#FFFFFF"
| 
| 12.11 (83)
| 
| 19.14 (128)
| Glenferrie Oval
| 8,000
| 23 August 1947
|- bgcolor="#FFFFFF"
| 
| 11.14 (80)
| 
| 24.11 (155)
| Western Oval
| 11,000
| 23 August 1947
|- bgcolor="#FFFFFF"
| 
| 10.13 (73)
| 
| 15.17 (107)
| Junction Oval
| 7,000
| 23 August 1947
|- bgcolor="#FFFFFF"
| 
| 18.22 (130)
| 
| 8.14 (62)
| Brunswick Street Oval
| 18,000
| 23 August 1947
|- bgcolor="#FFFFFF"
| 
| 20.14 (134)
| 
| 8.12 (60)
| Punt Road Oval
| 31,000
| 23 August 1947
|- bgcolor="#FFFFFF"
| 
| 10.12 (72)
| 
| 14.13 (97)
| Arden Street Oval
| 12,000
| 23 August 1947

Round 19

|- bgcolor="#CCCCFF"
| Home team
| Home team score
| Away team
| Away team score
| Venue
| Crowd
| Date
|- bgcolor="#FFFFFF"
| 
| 16.17 (113)
| 
| 11.13 (79)
| Punt Road Oval
| 22,000
| 30 August 1947
|- bgcolor="#FFFFFF"
| 
| 20.18 (138)
| 
| 10.14 (74)
| Brunswick Street Oval
| 13,000
| 30 August 1947
|- bgcolor="#FFFFFF"
| 
| 14.17 (101)
| 
| 16.12 (108)
| Victoria Park
| 33,000
| 30 August 1947
|- bgcolor="#FFFFFF"
| 
| 10.18 (78)
| 
| 27.9 (171)
| Junction Oval
| 6,000
| 30 August 1947
|- bgcolor="#FFFFFF"
| 
| 10.14 (74)
| 
| 10.10 (70)
| Arden Street Oval
| 4,000
| 30 August 1947
|- bgcolor="#FFFFFF"
| 
| 17.7 (109)
| 
| 16.11 (107)
| Kardinia Park
| 21,500
| 30 August 1947

Ladder

Finals

Semi finals

|- bgcolor="#CCCCFF"
| Home team
| Score
| Away team
| Score
| Venue
| Crowd
| Date
|- bgcolor="#FFFFFF"
| 
| 16.7 (103)
| 
| 11.9 (75)
| MCG
| 82,570
| 6 September
|- bgcolor="#FFFFFF"
| 
| 14.15 (99)
| 
| 11.17 (83)
| MCG
| 75,475
| 13 September

Preliminary Final

|- bgcolor="#CCCCFF"
| Home team
| Score
| Away team
| Score
| Venue
| Crowd
| Date
|- bgcolor="#FFFFFF"
| 
| 16.13 (109)
| 
| 14.12 (96)
| MCG
| 55,648
| 20 September

Grand final

Carlton defeated Essendon 13.8 (86) to 11.19 (85) in front of a crowd of 85,793 people. (For an explanation of scoring see Australian rules football).

Awards
 The 1947 VFL Premiership team was Carlton.
 The VFL's leading goalkicker was Fred Fanning of Melbourne with 97 goals.
 The winner of the 1947 Brownlow Medal was Bert Deacon of Carlton with 20 votes.
 St Kilda took the "wooden spoon" in 1947.
North Melbourne 16.13 (109) defeated  14.10 (94) in the Grand Final, played as a curtain-raiser to the senior Grand Final on Saturday 27 September at the Melbourne Cricket Ground.
Melbourne 12.13 (85) defeated  11.7 (73) on Saturday 6 September.

Notable events
 In Round 2, South Melbourne returned to the Lake Oval for the first time since 1941 after it was vacated by the military and had its grandstand rebuilt; this was the final home ground change related to World War II.
 At the first bounce, at the very start of the round 5 match between Hawthorn and Richmond, Richmond ruckman Laurie Taylor punched the ball an amazing 40 yards and dislocated his shoulder.
 Richmond champion Jack Titus, having retired early in the 1946 VFA season, having scored 1159 goals in his senior career of 294 games with Richmond (1926–1943), 23 games with Coburg (1945–1946), and 14 games for Victoria (1929–1934, 1936), played one match for the Richmond Second Eighteen when it was short of players at the age of 39 and scored 12 goals against North Melbourne.
 In round 6, with North Melbourne trailing Essendon by 44 points at three quarter time, North Melbourne captain Les Foote moved into the ruck and almost single-handedly led a comeback which ended with an eight-point victory to North Melbourne: North Melbourne 15.12 (102) to Essendon 14.10 (94).
 Western Australia defeated Victoria 16.10 (106) to 14.17 (101) at the Tenth ANFC Carnival in Tasmania. Also, in a challenge match, a combined South Australian and Western Australian team defeated the Victorian team 21.14 (140) to 19.15 (129).
 In the final round and his last league match before accepting a coaching job in the Western District, Melbourne's Fred Fanning kicked 18 goals 1 behind. This broke Gordon Coventry's Round 12, 1930 record for the most goals by one player in a VFL match, and still stands today.
 Carlton won the Grand Final by a point after Fred Stafford kicked a goal just before the final bell.

See also
 1947 VFL Grand Final
 Sixth round 1947

References

 Maplestone, M., Flying Higher: History of the Essendon Football Club 1872–1996, Essendon Football Club, (Melbourne), 1996. 
 Rogers, S. & Brown, A., Every Game Ever Played: VFL/AFL Results 1897–1997 (Sixth Edition), Viking Books, (Ringwood), 1998. 
 Ross, J. (ed), 100 Years of Australian Football 1897–1996: The Complete Story of the AFL, All the Big Stories, All the Great Pictures, All the Champions, Every AFL Season Reported, Viking, (Ringwood), 1996.

External links
 1947 Season – AFL Tables

Australian Football League seasons
Season